Andrei Alekseyevich Ivanov (born 8 October 1988) is a Russian former footballer. He played as a left back.

Club career

A product of the Spartak Moscow youth academy, Ivanov made his debut in the Russian Premier League on 26 December 2006 against Krylia Sovetov Samara. In 2009, he was loaned to Tom Tomsk until the end of the season. Next year, he went to Tomsk again on a one-year loan deal again, but was returned by the Moscow club in the mid-season to be in the starting lineup of the red-whites.

On 11 January 2011 Ivanov signed for Lokomotiv. A year later, after failing to make a fixture in the starting XI, he moved on loan to FC Tom Tomsk. The next season Ivanov spent also on loan, this time at FC Rostov. In the summer of 2013, he returned to Lokomotiv, but did not make his way into the first squad, featuring only for youth team. So, on 18 February 2014 his contract with Lokomotiv was terminated by mutual consent.

Career statistics

References

External links
  Profile on the Spartak Moscow official website
  Russian Premier League profile

1988 births
Footballers from Moscow
Living people
Russian footballers
Russia youth international footballers
Russia under-21 international footballers
Russia national football B team footballers
FC Spartak Moscow players
FC Tom Tomsk players
Russian Premier League players
FC Lokomotiv Moscow players
FC Rostov players
FC Sibir Novosibirsk players
FC SKA-Khabarovsk players
FC Torpedo Moscow players
Association football defenders